Stanisław Józef Srokowski (8 July 1872 in Węgrzce - 20 August 1950 in Warsaw) was a Polish geographer and diplomat.

Srokowski joined the Polish diplomatic service in 1920 and became the Polish Consul at Odessa and Königsberg. In 1923-1924 he was the Voivode of the Wołyń Voivodeship and became the Director of the Polish Baltic Institute at Toruń in 1926.

Srokowski was also a professor at the University of Warsaw prior to World War II and President of the Polish Geographical Society.

In 1946-1950 he was the head of the Polish Committee for Settling of Place Names (Komisja Ustalania Nazw Miejscowości), which determined the names of towns and villages in the Former eastern territories of Germany that became part of Poland after World War II.

Srokowski died in 1950, the village of Drengfurt (Dryfort) was renamed Srokowo in his memory.

Publications 
 Geografia gospodarcza Polski Warszawa 1939 Wyd. Instytut Społeczny
 Geografia gospodarcza ogólna Warszawa 1950 Wyd. Państwowe Zakłady Wydawnictw Szkolnych
 Z dni zawieruchy dziejowej: 1914-1918 Kraków 1932, Nakładem Księgarni Geograficznej "Orbis"
 Prusy Wschodnie. Studium Geograficzne, Gospodarcze i Społeczne Gdańsk - Bydgoszcz - Toruń 1945, Wyd. Biuro Ziem Zachodnich przy Ministerstwie Administracji Publicznej
 Prusy Wschodnie Warszawa 1947, Wyd. Państwowe Zakłady Wydawnictw Szkolnych
 Z krainy Czarnego Krzyża, Olsztyn 1980 Wyd. Pojezierze 
 Czesi: szkic kulturalno-obyczajowy Kraków 1898 Wyd. Hoesicka
 Wspomnienia z trzeciego powstania górnośląskiego 1921 r. Poznań 1926 Wyd. Związek Obrony Kresów Zachodnich,
  Zarys geografii fizycznej ziem polsko-litewsko-ruskich Kijów 1918, Wyd. Rady Okręgowej
 Uwagi o kresach wschodnich Kraków 1925
 Pomorze Zachodnie Gdańsk 1947 Wyd. Instytut Bałtycki

References 
 Małgorzata Szostakowska, Stanisław Srokowski (1872-1950) – polityk, dyplomata, geograf. Olsztyn 1999; 
 Sławomir Augusiewicz, Janusz Jasiński, Tadeusz Oracki, Wybitni Polacy w Królewcu. XVI-XX wiek, Olsztyn, Littera, 2005, 

1872 births
1950 deaths
People from Kraków County
People from the Kingdom of Galicia and Lodomeria
Polish diplomats
Polish geographers
Academic staff of the University of Warsaw
Polish nationalists
Voivodes of Volhynian Voivodeship
Recipients of the Order of Polonia Restituta